The 2021 Merrimack Warriors football team represented Merrimack College as a member of the Northeast Conference (NEC) in the 2021 NCAA Division I FCS football season. The Warriors, led by ninth-year head coach Dan Curran, played their home games at Duane Stadium.

Schedule

References

Merrimack
Merrimack Warriors football seasons
Merrimack Warriors football